By the year 1900, there were 14 market halls (or market houses) in Berlin.

References

Market halls
Buildings and structures in Berlin
Food retailers